Tuvalu is a 1999 experimental movie from Germany. The style evokes early 20th Century Silent movies and motifs commonly found in German expressionism.  The sparse dialog is presented in a mix of European languages. The film stars Denis Lavant as Anton and Chulpan Khamatova as Eva.

The film focuses on Anton as he tries to win the heart of Eva and save his family's bath house from the wrecking ball.

See also 
 Cinema of Germany

References

External links 
 
 

1999 films
German fantasy comedy films
1999 romantic comedy films
German black comedy films
Films without speech
Films shot in Bulgaria
Films scored by Goran Bregović
Films scored by Jürgen Knieper
1990s German films